"Living Without You" is a song by German recording artist Sandy Mölling. The pop ballad was written by Mölling along with Michelle Leonard, Martin Fliegenschmidt, and Kiko Masbaum for her second solo album, Frame of Mind (2006), while production was helmed by the latter. Released as the album's second and final single, "Living Without You" peaked at number 36 on the German Singles Chart, becoming the singer's lowest-charting single to date.

Track listings

Charts

Weekly charts

References

2006 singles
2006 songs
Songs written by Michelle Leonard